Brian Lydell (born August 5, 1972 in Brooklyn, New York, USA) is an American television Music Supervisor.

Positions held

All My Children
 Music Director (March, 2013–Present)

As the World Turns
 Music Director (May 10, 2004 - August 5, 2010)

One Life to Live
 Music Director (1999-2004)

All My Children
 Music Director (1999)

American Broadcasting Company
 Senior Music Supervisor (1997-2004)

Awards and nominations
Daytime Emmy Award
Win, 2014, Outstanding Achievement in Music Direction and Composition for a Drama Series, All My Children
Nom, 2014, Outstanding Achievement in Live and Direct to Tape Sound Mixing for a Drama Series, All My Children
Win, 2007, Outstanding Drama Series Directing Team, As the World Turns
Nom, 2006, Outstanding Achievement in Music Direction and Composition for a Drama Series, As The World Turns
Nom, 2004, Outstanding Achievement in Music Direction and Composition for a Drama Series, One Life to Live
Nom, 2002, Outstanding Achievement in Music Direction and Composition for a Drama Series, One Life to Live

External links

1972 births
Living people
Music directors
People from Brooklyn